De Wilde or de Wilde is a Dutch surname, meaning "the wild one". Abroad the name can be agglutinated like DeWilde, Dewilde or deWilde. Some notable people who have this surname are:

 August De Wilde (1819–1886), Belgian painter
 Autumn de Wilde (b. 1970), American photographer
 Bernard de Wilde (1691–1772), Belgian architect
 Brandon deWilde (1942–1972), American theatre and film actor
 Christiaan De Wilde, Belgian business executive
 Dingenis de Wilde (1885–1947), Dutch sports shooter
  (1919–2005), Dutch museum curator
 Dom DeWilde, an alias of Don Preston (born 1932), American jazz and rock keyboardist
 Etienne De Wilde (b. 1958), Belgian road bicycle racer
 Filip de Wilde (b. 1964), Belgian football goalkeeper 
 Jaap de Wilde (b. 1957), Dutch international relations scholar
 Jacob de Wilde (1645–1721), Dutch numismatist
 Jacob Adriaan de Wilde (1879–1956), Dutch politician 
 Julien De Wilde (b. 1944), Belgian business executive
 Katherine August-deWilde, American business executive
 Laurent de Wilde (b. 1960), French jazz musician
 Lisa de Wilde (b. 1956), Canadian film and television executive 
 Maria de Wilde (1682–1729), Dutch engraver and playwright 
 Marius Dewilde (1921–1996), French railway worker who claimed to have been contacted by extraterrestrials 
 Robert de Wilde (b. 1977), Dutch motocross racer 
 Samuel De Wilde (1751–1832), English portrait painter
 Sebastiaan De Wilde (b. 1993), Belgian footballer
  (b. 1983), Belgian racing cyclist

See also
 De Wild, Dutch surname
 De Wildt, town and wildlife centre in South Africa named after Mauritz Edgar de Wildt
 Wilde, English surname

References

Dutch-language surnames